Hyperthaema signatus is a moth of the subfamily Arctiinae. It was described by Francis Walker in 1862. It is found in Brazil.

References

 

Phaegopterina
Moths described in 1862